Ecopoetry is poetry with a strong ecological emphasis or message. Many poets, poems and books of poems have expressed ecological concerns; but only recently has the term ecopoetry gained use.  There is now, in English-speaking poetry, a recognisable subgenre of ecopoetry.

Prior to the term, a number of poems had ecological messages. Although these poets did not mention the word, they were clearly 'Ecopoetic' in stance and exerted an influence on the subsequent subgenre.  Examples include: the book Ecopoemas of Nicanor Parra (1982), The White Poem by Jay Ramsay & Carole Bruce (Rivelin Grapheme Press, 1988), Bosco (Hearing Eye, 1999; 2001) and (more recently) Heavy Water: a poem for Chernobyl (Enitharmon Press, 2004).
Early publications also include  The Green Book of Poetry by Ivo Mosley  (1995, Frontier Publishing and Harper San Francisco, 1996 as  Earth Poems ). It includes over three hundred poems from around the world, many translated by Mosley, and helped to define and establish the genre.

One of a number of seminal texts helping to introduce the term into wider, critical use was Ecopoetry: a Critical Introduction edited by J. Scott Bryson (2002).  Another example of the burgeoning use of the term at the millennial turn was the journal Ecopoetics, which broadened the term from poetry into poiesis interpreted as making or writing more generally.

One of the fundamental premises of Ecopoetics is derived from an ideological perspective that desires the conception of difference or alterity as non-oppositional; we are challenged to view things in relation. Meaning the writing is made of an ecosystem. The writing is distinctive in that its characteristics relate to one another.

Since then, a spate of poetry anthologies and books has appeared, either employing the word explicitly or using the idea as a guiding principle.  Recent instances include Alice Oswald's The Thunder Mutters (2005), Forrest Gander & John Kinsella's Redstart: an Ecological Poetics, and the ground-breaking Earth Shattering: Ecopoems, edited by Neil Astley at Bloodaxe Books (2007).

One of the chief characteristics of ecopoetry, as defined by James Engelhardt, is that it is connected to the world in a way that implies responsibility.  As with other models that explore and assume engagement (Marxism, feminism, etc.), Ecopoetry is "surrounded by questions of ethics".

As a means of describing poetry or poetic projects that embrace the ecological imperative for personal sensitivity and social change, ecopoetry has been cited by such writers as John Burnside and Mario Petrucci.

References

Bibliography 
 'Planting Roots: A Survey of Introductions to Ecopoetry and Ecocriticism' by Caitlin Maling, Cordite Poetry Review
 'Ecopoems': term used in title of Earth Shattering: Ecopoems (ed. Neil Astley; Bloodaxe 2007) .
 Redstart: An Ecological Poetics by Forrest Gander and John Kinsella (University of Iowa Press, 2012) 
 Ecopoetry: a Critical Introduction (ed. J. Scott Bryson; University of Utah Press 2002) .
 The Future of the Past: Ecopoetics by Forrest Gander at The Free Library
 The White Poem by Jay Ramsay and Carole Bruce (Rivelin Grapheme Press, 1988) .
 Bosco by Mario Petrucci (Hearing Eye, 1999; 2001)  .
 Heavy Water: a poem for Chernobyl (Enitharmon Press, 2004)  .
 The Thunder Mutters: 101 Poems About the Planet (ed., Alice Oswald; Faber & Faber, 2005)  .
Intatto. Intact / Ecopoesia. Ecopoetry by Massimo D'Arcangelo, Anne Elvey and Helen Moore (La Vita Felice, 2017) 
 The Language Habitat: an Ecopoetry Manifesto by James Engelhardt (2007).
  Manifesto of Italian  ECOPOETRY (2005) by M. Ivana Trevisani Bach Archive link
 Literary journal: Ecopoetics
 The Poetry Society's Ecopoetry Study Packs
Blue Mars by Kim Stanley Robinson - 1996 - A Bantam Spectra Book - .
 Ecopoetry by V.I.Postnikov (The Trumpeter, 2001, 17,1)  http://trumpeter.athabascau.ca.
'Earth Under Attack-Nature's Poetry' by R.S Mallari

 
British poetry
British literary movements
British Poetry Revival
Genres of poetry
Environmental humanities
Environmental literature